Mansour Akram Ojjeh (25 September 1952 – 6 June 2021) was a French Saudi Arabian-born entrepreneur who owned part of TAG, a Luxembourg-based holding company with interests worldwide. Ojjeh was the CEO of TAG, which owns 14.32% of the McLaren Group, assets of which include McLaren Automotive and the McLaren Formula One team since the 1970s and 2000s.

He was at one time the owner of TAG Heuer and Farnborough Airport. He also owned 10% of the upmarket jewellers Asprey and Garrard.

Early life and education

Ojjeh was born in 1952 and was the son of Syrian born Saudi businessman Akram Ojjeh, son-in-law to Mustafa Tlass and the owner of Techniques d'Avant Garde based in Luxembourg, an investment company that was focused mainly in advanced technologies. His father was an intermediary in deals between Saudi Arabia and France, particularly arms sales. His mother was French and he spent much of his childhood in France. He attended American School in Paris, and graduated in 1974 with a degree in Business Administration from Menlo College in California. Ojjeh gained his master's degree later in Santa Clara University. He has 4 siblings.

Career

TAG Group
After graduating from college. Ojjeh was named CEO of the company founded by his father, TAG Group, which largely operates in Europe and the Middle East. The company originally invested in numerous sectors such as motor racing, aviation and watchmaking. The firm became famous for brokering deals between France and Saudi Arabia, especially with regards to defense systems and weapons. in 1985, Ojjeh bought Heuer, a watchmaker based in Switzerland, which marks the beginning of TAG Heuer watch brand. Ojjeh's company, TAG Gruppe, was the largest single shareholder of TAG Heuer. LVMH Moёt Hennessy Louis Vuitton bought the brand in 1999 for $740 million. During the early days of his tenure as the CEO of TAG Group, Ojjeh has tried to avoid publicity as much as he could but hit the headlines when he purchased the liner Le France. He assumed the presidency of the company after the death of his father, Akram Ojjeh, in 1991.

Motorsport career

Williams
Ojjeh's interest with motorsport began when he watched the 1978 Monaco Grand Prix as a guest of the Saudi Arabian royal family, which owned flag-carrier Saudia, a sponsor of Williams Racing. Ojjeh's company at the time had brokered numerous deals between France and his native Saudi Arabia. The race turned Ojjeh into a big racing fanatic and convinced him to expand his business further in motorsport investment starting from the sponsorship to funding the racing engine development for the F1 team later at some point.

At the first attempt to enter motorsport, Ojjeh brokered a sponsorship deal between his company TAG Group and Williams. In 1979, TAG Group successfully secured the position as principal sponsor for Williams. He became the company's familiar representative in the paddock, along with his younger brother Aziz. With the influx of capital invested by Ojjeh's TAG Group, Williams team Engineering Director at the time Patrick Head was able to build a competitive engine for Williams FW07. The engine project was successful and the team secured victory in 1979 British Grand Prix with Swiss driver Clay Regazzoni. Under Ojjeh's sponsorship, Williams produced two champions, Australian driver Alan Jones who was the first driver to win the World Driver Championship title for Williams in 1980, and Finnish driver Keke Rosberg who won in 1982.

McLaren
In 1981, Ojjeh met British businessman Ron Dennis, who was the CEO of McLaren Group which owned a racing team McLaren. Dennis persuaded Ojjeh to become his partner to manage McLaren racing team. Ojjeh agreed with Dennis terms and become the majority stakeholder for McLaren Group, owning 60 percent of the stake in the company. During the 1980s, Ojjeh invested in Porsche-built turbocharged engines which carried the name of his company, Techniques d'Avant Garde (TAG). During Ojjeh early career in McLaren, him and Ron Dennis has brought back the then-retired Formula One champion Niki Lauda to the grid as McLaren driver in 1982. It was unveiled at the Geneva Motor Show in early 1983 and raced for the first time at the 1983 Dutch Grand Prix in August 1983. In 1984, the McLaren-Tag Porsche dominated F1, the team winning 12 of 16 races and Lauda beating team-mate Prost to the title by the smallest margin in history, half a point. McLaren domination of the sport began in that era. In 1984 season, Lauda won his third championship with his team-mate Alain Prost scoring half points behind him and team won the constructor championship two years streak. Prost would later claim his championship title the next year 1985 season and 1986 season as well despite the team only finished 2nd in constructor championship. The TAG powertrain usage came to an end in 1987 season due to the powertrain losing its competitive values and McLaren sign a deal with Honda as its new powertrain.

Ojjeh's involvement at McLaren continued past the end of TAG-badged powertrains. The team would later sign 3 years contract with Brazilian driver Ayrton Senna, on recommendation from Honda. McLaren would continue its domination with Honda engine in 1988 onwards. The team would secure the constructor championship 4 times, with Senna winning the driver championship three times and Prost once during the Honda era. The McLaren-Honda engine deal came to an end in 1993 as Japan faced a domestic economic crisis. McLaren would move on to sign with Ford, Peugeot, and finally Mercedes.

During the Mercedes era, the team would secure the constructor championship once and driver championship twice with Finnish driver Mika Häkkinen winning the  1998 and 1999 seasons. In 2000, after supplying engines to the team through its Mercedes subsidiary for 5 years, Daimler AG exercised an option to buy 40% of the TAG McLaren Group. Dennis and Ojjeh each retained a 30% share, and each sold half of their stake to the Mumtalakat Holding Company (the sovereign wealth fund of the Kingdom of Bahrain) in 2007. Although Daimler were reportedly considering acquiring the remaining 60% from Dennis and Ojjeh, they instead bought Brawn GP (renaming it Mercedes GP) in November 2009; their McLaren shares were sold back to Mumtalakat, Dennis, and Ojjeh in 2010.

As the team performance deteriorated, Ojjeh's relationship with Dennis was heavily affected. Both have faced numerous disagreement between each other since. During these times McLaren was criticized due to underperforming after resuming the powertrain supply deal with Honda which affected the car performance. In 2014, while Ojjeh was hospitalized for lung disease, Dennis removed CEO Martin Whitmarsh who was a close friend of Ojjeh and terminated the team contract with Mexican driver Sergio Pérez in order to give way to Danish driver Kevin Magnussen; both in opposition to Ojjeh's wishes. In 2015 Dennis wanted to keep Kevin Magnussen to partner Fernando Alonso in 2015, it was Ojjeh who stepped in and undermined him, forcing him to take Jenson Button instead. In 2016, Ron Dennis stepped down from McLaren. Later, Dennis unsuccessfully sued Ojjeh and Mumtalakat.

Health issues

In late 2013 Ojjeh had a double lung transplant after suffering with IPF lung disease for the previous four years, returning to full health in 2014.

Ojjeh died on the morning of 6 June 2021 at the age of 68. McLaren Racing paid tribute to him with his name written in McLaren's logo style on the MCL35M and team cap at the 2021 French Grand Prix.

References

Saudi Arabian businesspeople
Saudi Arabian motorsport people
Saudi Arabian emigrants to France
Saudi Arabian people of Syrian descent
Saudi Arabian people of French descent
Formula One team owners
1952 births
2021 deaths
McLaren people
French people of Syrian descent
Lung transplant recipients
Menlo College alumni